Line 300 is one of Căile Ferate Române's main lines in Romania, having a total length of . The main line, connecting Bucharest with the Hungarian border near Oradea, passes through Ploiești, Brașov, Sighișoara, Teiuș and Cluj-Napoca. The section between Bucharest and Ploiești is shared with CFR line 500.

The section between Câmpina and Predeal was upgraded between 2007 and 2011, bringing several improvements to the infrastructure along the route.

Secondary lines

References

Railway lines in Romania
Standard gauge railways in Romania